Acmispon grandiflorus, synonym Lotus grandiflorus, is a species of legume native to western North America. It is known by the common name chaparral bird's-foot trefoil.

It is native to the west coast of North America from Washington to north-western Mexico, including California and Baja California, where it is found in many mountainous areas in the chaparral and coniferous forests.

Description
Acmispon grandiflorus is a perennial herb taking an erect to decumbent form. It is lined with leaves each made up of oval leaflets 1 to 2 centimeters long and hairy to hairless in texture.

The inflorescence is made up 3 to 9 pealike flowers which may approach three centimeters long. The flower varies in color from whitish to yellow to pink.

The fruit is a legume pod up to 6 centimeters long.

References

External links

Jepson Manual Treatment of Lotus grandiflorus
USDA Plants Profile for Lotus grandiflorus
Lotus grandiflorus — Photo gallery

grandiflorus
Flora of the Northwestern United States
Flora of the Southwestern United States
Flora of Northwestern Mexico
Flora of the Cascade Range
Flora of the Sierra Nevada (United States)
Natural history of the California chaparral and woodlands
Natural history of the California Coast Ranges
Natural history of the Peninsular Ranges
Natural history of the San Francisco Bay Area
Natural history of the Santa Monica Mountains
Natural history of the Transverse Ranges
Flora without expected TNC conservation status